Magnolia caricifragrans is a species of plant in the family Magnoliaceae. It is endemic to Colombia.

References

caricifragrans
Endemic flora of Colombia
Endangered plants
Taxonomy articles created by Polbot